Thomas-Étienne Hamel (b. Quebec City, December 28, 1830; d. Quebec City, July 16, 1913) was a French-Canadian priest and academic. He was the son of Victor Hamel, a merchant and Therèse DeFoy.

In 1852, as a student of the Séminaire de Québec, he traveled with Louis-Jacques Casault to London where they arranged for the royal charter of what would become Laval University. After his ordination in 1854, he was sent to Paris' École des Carmes and eventually graduated from the Sorbonne with a license in science, before returning to Quebec to teach at the Séminaire, also acquiring the office of general secretary of the new university. He became rector of the Séminaire de Québec and Laval University (1871–1880, 1883–1886, librarian from 1888) and a founder as well as a president (1886–1887) of the Royal Society of Canada. He was Vicar general of the Archdiocese of Quebec from 1871 and appointed an apostolic prothonotary in 1886. In 1881, he led a delegation to Rome to argue against the independence of the Montreal branch (which would ultimately become the Université de Montréal).

Hamel wrote a biography of Elzéar-Alexandre Taschereau (Le Premier Cardinal Canadien, 1888) and a manual of rhetoric (Un Cours d'éloquence parlée d'après Delsarte, 1906). His contributions to the study of the Music of Quebec, notably his Annales musicales du Petit-Cap (an unpublished compilation of folk songs preserved at the Séminaire), have been little studied. Although an entry for him was intended for inclusion in the Dictionary of Canadian Biography, it was never included for unknown reasons, and no definitive biography of him exists.

References

External links
 

 

1830 births
1913 deaths
University of Paris alumni
Rectors of Université Laval
19th-century Canadian Roman Catholic priests
People from Quebec City
Fellows of the Royal Society of Canada
Apostolic pronotaries
Academic staff of Université Laval